is a railway station in Yamagata, Yamagata Prefecture, Japan, operated by East Japan Railway Company (JR East).

Lines
Yamagata Station is served by the following lines.
 Yamagata Shinkansen
 Ōu Main Line
 Senzan Line
 Aterazawa Line

Station layout

The station has a "Midori no Madoguchi" staffed ticket office and a View Plaza travel agency.

Platforms

History
Yamagata Station opened on 11 April 1901. With the privatization of JNR on 1 April 1987, the station came under the control of JR East.

Yamagata Shinkansen services started on 1 July 1992. From 4 December 1999, Yamagata Shinkansen services were extended to Shinjō Station.

Passenger statistics
In fiscal 2012, the station was used by an average of 10,860 passengers daily (boarding passengers only). The passenger figures for previous years are as shown below.

Surrounding area
 Yamagata City Office
 Yamagata Museum of Art
 Mogami Yoshiaki Historical Museum
 Yamagata Citizens' Hall
 Yamagata Gakuin High School
 Yamagata No. 3 Junior High School

References

External links 

 Yamagata Station (JR East) 
 Yamagata Station map

Stations of East Japan Railway Company
Railway stations in Yamagata Prefecture
Ōu Main Line
Yamagata Shinkansen
Senzan Line
Aterazawa Line
Railway stations in Japan opened in 1901